Organix Inc is a US fine chemicals company specialising in chemical synthesis of analytical standards and custom synthesis of finished compounds and intermediates.

Chemistry
Organix carries out research and development of novel molecules used in a variety of pharmaceutical research applications. Some notable compounds include;
 O-526 
 O-774
 O-806
 O-823
 O-1057
 O-1072 (Tropoxane)
 O-1125
 O-1238
 O-1269
 O-1270
 O-1399
 O-1602
 O-1656
 O-1660
 O-1812
 O-1871
 O-1918
 O-2050
 O-2113
 O-2172
 O-2371
 O-2372
 O-2387
 O-2390
 O-2394
 O-2545
 O-2694
 O-4210
 O-4310 

Life sciences industry